Jake Cooper may refer to:

Jake Cooper (socialist) (1916–1990), American socialist
Jake Cooper (footballer, born 1995), English footballer (Reading, Millwall)
Jake Cooper (footballer, born 2001), English footballer (Rotherham, Gateshead, Hartlepool, Darlington)